Mammalia is a class of animal within the phylum Chordata. Mammal classification has been through several iterations since Carl Linnaeus initially defined the class. No classification system is universally accepted; McKenna & Bell (1997) and Wilson & Reader (2005) provide useful recent compendiums. Many earlier ideas from Linnaeus et al. have been completely abandoned by modern taxonomists, among these are the idea that bats are related to birds or that humans represent a group outside of other living things. Competing ideas about the relationships of mammal orders do persist and are currently in development. Most significantly in recent years, cladistic thinking has led to an effort to ensure that all taxonomic designations represent monophyletic groups. The field has also seen a recent surge in interest and modification due to the results of molecular phylogenetics.

George Gaylord Simpson's classic "Principles of Classification and a Classification of Mammals" (Simpson, 1945) taxonomy text laid out a systematics of mammal origins and relationships that was universally taught until the end of the 20th century.

Since Simpson's 1945 classification, the paleontological record has been recalibrated, and the intervening years have seen much debate and progress concerning the theoretical underpinnings of systematization itself, partly through the new concept of cladistics. Though field work gradually made Simpson's classification outdated, it remained the closest thing to an official classification of mammals. See List of placental mammals and List of monotremes and marsupials for more detailed information on mammal genera and species.

Molecular classification of placentals
Molecular studies by molecular systematists, based on DNA analysis, in the early 21st century have revealed new relationships among mammal families. Classification systems based on molecular studies reveal three major groups or lineages of placental mammals, Afrotheria, Xenarthra, and Boreotheria. which diverged from early common ancestors in the Cretaceous.

The relationships between these three lineages are contentious, and all three have been proposed as basal in different hypotheses.

The following taxonomy only includes living placentals (infraclass Eutheria):

Atlantogenata

Afrotheria
Class Afroinsectiphilia
Order Macroscelidea
Family Macroscelididae: (20 species), sengis or elephant shrews (Africa)
Order Afrosoricida
Family Tenrecidae: (31 species), tenrecs (Madagascar) 
Family Potamogalidae: (3 species), otter-shrews (West and Central Africa)
Family Chrysochloridae: (21 species), golden moles (Africa south of the Sahara)
Order Tubulidentata
Family Orycteropodidae: (1 species), aardvark (Africa south of the Sahara)
Class Paenungulata
Order Proboscidea
Family Elephantidae: (3 species), elephants (Africa, Southeast Asia)
Order Hyracoidea
Family Procaviidae: (4 species), hyraxes, dassies (Africa, Arabia)
Order Sirenia
Family Dugongidae: (1 species), dugong (East Africa, Red Sea, North Australia)
Family Trichechidae: (3 species), manatees (tropical Atlantic coasts and adjacent rivers)

Xenarthra
Order Cingulata
Family Chlamyphoridae: (14 species), armadillos (Neotropical)
Family Dasypodidae: (7 species), long-nosed armadillos (Neotropical and Nearctic)
Order Pilosa (=Dasypoda)
Suborder Vermilingua (anteaters)
Family Cyclopedidae: (1 species), silky anteater (Neotropical)
Family Myrmecophagidae: (3 species), anteaters (Neotropical)
Suborder Folivora (sloths)
Family Choloepodidae: (2 species), two-toed sloths (Neotropical)
Family Bradypodidae: (4 species), three-toed sloths (Neotropical)

Boreoeutheria

Euarchontoglires 

Superorder Euarchonta
Order Scandentia
Family Ptilocercidae (1 species), pen-tailed treeshrews (Southeast Asia)
Family Tupaiidae: (19 species), treeshrews (Southeast Asia)
Mirorder Primatomorpha
Order Dermoptera
Family Cynocephalidae: (2 species), flying lemurs or colugos (Southeast Asia)
Order Primates: lemurs, bushbabies, monkeys, apes (cosmopolitan) 
Family Cheirogaleidae: (32 species), dwarf lemurs (Madagascar)
Family Lemuridae: (22 species), lemurs (Madagascar)
Family Lepilemuridae: (26 species), sportive lemurs (Madagascar)
Family Indriidae: (19 species), indri and sifakas (Madagascar)
Family Daubentoniidae: (1 species), aye-aye (Madagascar area)
Family Lorisidae: (9 species), lorises and potto (Africa and Southeast Asia)
Family Galagidae: (19 species), galagos (Africa) 
Family Tarsiidae: (9 species), tarsiers (Southeast Asia)
Family Callitrichidae: (41 species), marmosets and tamarins (South America)
Family Cebidae: (14 species), New World monkeys (South America)
Family Cercopithecidae: (137 species), Old World monkeys (Africa and Eurasia)
Family Hylobatidae: (14 species), gibbons (Southeast Asia)
Family Hominidae: (8 species), great apes (worldwide)
Superorder Glires
Order Lagomorpha: pikas, rabbits, hares (Eurasia, Africa, Americas) 
Family Leporidae: (60 species), rabbits and hares (Eurasia, Africa, Americas)
Family Ochotonidae: (30 species), pikas (Holarctic)
Order Rodentia: rodents (cosmopolitan)
Suborder Castorimorpha 
Family Castoridae: (2 species) beavers (Holarctic)
Family Geomyidae: (about 35 species) pocket gophers (North America)
Family Heteromyidae: (about 59 species) kangaroo rats and kangaroo mice (North America)
Suborder Myomorpha
Family Dipodidae: (33 species) jerboas (Africa, Eurasia, North America)
Family Zapodidae: (11 species) jumping mice (North America, Asia)
Family Sicistidae: (19 species) birch mice (Eurasia)
Family Platacanthomyidae: (3 species) spiny dormouse (Southeast Asia)
Family Spalacidae: (37 species) zokors, root rats, blind mole rats (Africa, Eurasia)
Family Calomyscidae: (8 species) mouse-like hamsters (Asia)
Family Nesomyidae: (68 species) old endemic African muroids (Africa, Madagascar)
Family Cricetidae: (about 580 species) hamsters, voles, and New World rats and mice (Holarctic, South America)
Family Muridae: (about 1,383 species) Old World rats and mice and gerbils (Africa, Eurasia, Australia)
Suborder Anomaluromorpha
Family Anomaluridae: (6 species) scaly-tailed flying squirrels (Africa)
Family Pedetidae: (2 species) springhares or springhaas (Africa)
Suborder Hystricomorpha
Family Ctenodactylidae: (5 species) gundis (Africa, Asia)
Family Diatomyidae: (1 species) Laotian rock rat (Southeast Asia)
Family Hystricidae: (11 Species) Old World porcupines (Africa, Asia)
Family Bathyergidae: (about 21 species) African mole-rats (Africa)
Family Petromuridae: (1 species) rock dassies (Africa)
Family Thryonomyidae: (2 species) cane rats (Africa)
Family Erethizontidae: (19 species) New World porcupines (New World)
Family Chinchillidae: (3 species) chinchillas and viscachas (South America)
Family Dinomyidae: (1 species) pacarana (South America)
Family Caviidae: (18 species) cavies and capybara (South America)
Family Dasyproctidae: (13 species) agoutis and acouchis (South America)
Family Cuniculidae: (about 3 species) paca (South America)
Family Ctenomyidae: (about 60 species) tuco-tucos (South America)
Family Octodontidae: (14 species) degus (South America)
Family Abrocomidae: (9 species) chinchilla-rats (South America)
Family Echimyidae: spiny rats (South America)
Family Capromyidae: (10 species) hutias (South America)
Family Heptaxodontidae: giant Hutias (recently extinct)
Family Myocastoridae: (57 species) nutrias (South America)
Suborder Sciuromorpha 
Family Aplodontiidae: (1 species) mountain beaver (western North America)
Family Sciuridae: (about 285 species) squirrels, chipmunks, and marmots (cosmopolitan except Australia)
Family Gliridae: (29 species) dormice (Africa, Eurasia)

Laurasiatheria
Order Eulipotyphla
Family Solenodontidae: (2 species) solenodons (Cuba, Hispaniola)
Family Nesophontidae: nesophontes (West Indies shrews) [recently extinct]
Family Soricidae: (385 species) shrews (Eurasia, Africa, North America to northern South America)
Family Talpidae: (59 species) moles, shrew-moles, desmans (Eurasia, North America)
Family Erinaceidae: (26 species)hedgehogs, gymnures (Eurasia, Africa)
Family Galericidae: (8 species) moonrats (southeast Asia)
Grandorder Chiroptera 
Order Chiroptera: bats 
Suborder Yinpterochiroptera 
Family Pteropodidae: (about 197 species) flying foxes (Africa, Eurasia, Australia)
Family Hipposideridae: (84 species) trident bats, leaf-nosed bats
Family Rhinolophidae: (106 species) horseshoe bats (Old World)
Family Rhinopomatidae: (6 species) mouse-tailed bats (Africa, Southeast Asia)
Family Craseonycteridae: (1 species) Kitti's hog-nosed bat (Thailand)
Family Megadermatidae: (6 species) false vampire bats (Africa, Southeast Asia, Australia)
Suborder Yangochiroptera 
Family Emballonuridae: (54 species) sac-winged bats (southern continents)
Family Nycteridae: (about 15 species) slit-faced bats (Africa, Southeast Asia)
Family Mystacinidae: (about 2 species) short-tailed bats (New Zealand)
Family Thyropteridae: (5 species) sucker-footed bats (South America)
Family Furipteridae: (2 species) smoky bats (South America)
Family Noctilionidae: (2 species) fishing bats (South America)
Family Mormoopidae: (about 11 species) leaf-chinned bats (South America)
Family Phyllostomidae: (192 species) leaf-nosed bats (South America)
Family Myzopodidae: (2 species) sucker-footed bats (Madagascar)
Family Natalidae: (10 species) funnel-eared bats (South America)
Family Molossidae: (about 110 species) free-tailed bats (cosmopolitan)
Family Miniopteridae: (about 40 species) long-fingered bats (Africa, Eurasia, Australia)
Family Cistugidae: (2 species) wing-gland bats (Southern Africa)
Family Vespertilionidae: (over 300 species) vesper bats (cosmopolitan)
Grandorder Ferae
Order Pholidota
Family Manidae: (about 8 species) pangolins, scaly anteaters (Africa, South Asia)
Order Carnivora: carnivorans (cosmopolitan)
Suborder Feliformia
Family Nandiniidae: (4 species) African palm civet (Central Africa)
Family Prionodontidae: (2 species) Asiatic linsangs (Southeast Asia)
Family Felidae: (41 species) cats (cosmopolitan except Australia)
Family Viverridae: (33 species) civets, Asiatic palm civets (Africa, Southern Europe, Southeast Asia)
Family Herpestidae: (34 species) mongooses (Africa, Asia, Southern Europe)
Family Eupleridae: (10 species) Malagasy carnivorans (Madagascar)
Family Hyaenidae: (4 species) hyaenas, aardwolf (Africa)
Suborder Caniformia
Family Canidae: (38 species) dogs (cosmopolitan)
Family Ursidae: (8 species) bears (Europe, Asia, New World)
Family Otariidae: (15 species) eared seals (cosmopolitan except North Atlantic)
Family Odobenidae: (1 species) walrus (Northern North American, Northern Europe, Northern Asia)
Family Phocidae: (18 species) true seals (cosmopolitan)
Family Ailuridae: (1 species) red panda (South-Central Asia)
Family Mephitidae: (12 species) skunks (Southeast Asia, New World)
Family Mustelidae: (about 69 species) weasels and relatives (cosmopolitan except Australia)
Family Procyonidae: (14 species) ringtails, olingos, kinkajou, raccoons, coatis (New World)
Grandorder Ungulata
Order Perissodactyla: odd-toed ungulates
Family Equidae: (13 species) horses, zebras, donkeys (Africa, West and Central Asia)
Family Tapiridae: (3 species) tapirs (Central and South America, Southeast Asia)
Family Rhinocerotidae: (5 species) rhinoceroses (Africa, Southeast Asia)
Order Artiodactyla: even-toed ungulates (now includes Cetaceans)
Suborder Suiformes
Family Suidae: (18 species) pigs (Africa, Eurasia) 
Family Tayassuidae: (about 3 species) peccaries (New World)
Suborder Tylopoda
Family Camelidae: (7 species) camels (South America, Asia)
Suborder Ruminantia
Family Tragulidae: (10 species) mouse-deer (Africa, Asia)
Family Antilocapridae: (1 species) pronghorn (North America)
Family Giraffidae: (2-9 species) giraffe and okapi (Africa) 
Family Cervidae: (26 species) deer (Holarctic, South America)
Family Moschidae: (7 species) musk deer (Asia) 
Family Bovidae: (143 species) cattle, antelope, sheep, etc. (Africa, Holarctic) 
Suborder Whippomorpha
Family Hippopotamidae: (2 species) hippos (Africa)
Infraorder Cetacea
Parvorder Mysticeti
Family Balaenopteridae: (10 species) rorquals and grey whales (cosmopolitan)
Family Balaenidae: (4 species) right and bowhead whales (polar and temperate waters)
Family Eschrichtiidae: (1 species) gray whale (North Pacific and North Atlantic)
Family Neobalaenidae: (1 species) pygmy right whales (southern hemisphere) 
Parvorder Odontoceti
Family Delphinidae: (about 37 species) dolphins (cosmopolitan)
Family Monodontidae: (2 species) beluga and narwhal (Arctic, Atlantic, and Pacific)
Family Phocoenidae: (8 species) porpoises (cosmopolitan)
Family Physeteridae: (3 species) sperm whales (cosmopolitan)
Family Kogiidae: (2 species) dwarf sperm whales (cosmopolitan)
Family Platanistidae: (2 species) South Asian river dolphin (Southern Asia)
Family Iniidae: (1-4 species) Amazon River dolphin (South America)
Family Pontoporiidae: (1 species) La Plata River dolphin (South America)
Family Lipotidae: baiji
Family Ziphiidae: (24 species) beaked whales (cosmopolitan)

Standardized textbook classification

A somewhat standardized classification system has been adopted by most current mammalogy classroom textbooks. The following taxonomy of extant and recently extinct mammals is taken from the 6th edition of Vaughan's Mammalogy. This approach emphasizes an initial split between egg-laying prototherians and live-bearing therians. The therians are further divided into the marsupial Metatheria and the "placental" Eutheria. No attempt is made in this classification to further distinguish among the orders within these subclasses and infraclasses. This system also makes no note of the position of entirely fossil groups.

In this and later taxonomies, families are merely listed under the order to which they belong. More detailed relationships among families is presented in the article of each order.

Subclass Prototheria
Order Monotremata
Family Tachyglossidae (echidnas)
Family Ornithorhynchidae (platypuses)

Subclass Theria
Infraclass Metatheria (marsupials and their nearest ancestors)
Order Didelphimorphia
Family Didelphidae (opossums, etc.)
Order Paucituberculata
Family Caenolestidae (shrew opossums)
Order Microbiotheria
Family Microbiotheriidae (monitos del monte)
Order Dasyuromorphia (most carnivorous marsupials)
Family Thylacinidae (Tasmanian tigers)
Family Myrmecobiidae (numbats)
Family Dasyuridae (Tasmanian devils, quolls, dunnarts, planigale, etc.)
Order Peramelemorphia (bandicoots, bilbies, etc.)
Family Peramelidae (bandicoots, echymiperas)

Family †Chaeropodidae (pig-footed bandicoot) 
Order Notoryctemorphia (marsupial moles)
Family Notoryctidae
Order Diprotodontia
Family Phascolarctidae (koalas)
Family Vombatidae (wombats)
Family Phalangeridae (brushtail possums and cuscuses)
Family Potoroidae (bettongs, potoroos and rat kangaroos)
Family Macropodidae (kangaroos, wallabies, etc.)
Family Burramyidae (pygmy possums)
Family Pseudocheiridae (ringtailed possums, etc.)
Family Petauridae (striped possum, Leadbeater's possum, yellow-bellied glider, sugar glider, mahogany glider and squirrel glider)
Family Tarsipedidae (honey possum)
Family Acrobatidae (feathertail glider and feather-tailed possum)
Family Hypsiprymnodontidae (musky rat kangaroo)
Infraclass Eutheria
Order Afrosoricida
Family Tenrecidae (tenrecs)
Family Chrysochloridae (golden moles)
Order Macroscelidea
Family Macroscelididae (elephant-shrews
Order Tubulidentata
Family Orycteropodidae (aardvark)
Order Proboscidea
Family Elephantidae (elephants)
Order Sirenia
Family Dugongidae (dugongs, sea cows)
Family Trichechidae (manatees)
Order Hyracoidea
Family Procaviidae (hyraxes)
Order Pilosa
Family Bradypodidae (three-toed tree sloths)
Family Megalonychidae (two-toed tree sloths)
Family Myrmecophagidae (tamanduas and giant anteater)
Family Cyclopedidae (silky anteater)
Order Cingulata
Family Dasypodidae (armadillos)
Order Dermoptera
Family Cynocephalidae (colugos)
Order Scandentia
Family Tupaiidae (tree shrews)
Family Ptilocercidae (pen-tailed treeshrew
Order Primates
Family Cheirogaleidae (dwarf lemurs, mouse lemurs)
Family Lemuridae (lemurs)
Family Lepilemuridae (sportive lemurs)
Family Indriidae (wooly lemurs, sifakas)
Family Daubentoniidae (aye-aye)
Family Lorisidae (lorises)
Family Galagidae (bushbabies, galagos)
Family Tarsiidae (tarsiers)
Family Cebidae (marmosets, tamarins, capuchins, squirrel monkeys)
Family Aotidae (night monkeys)
Family Pitheciidae (titis, uacaris, sakis)
Family Atelidae (howlers, spider monkeys, wooly monkeys)
Family Cercopithecidae (Old World monkeys)
Family Hylobatidae (gibbons)
Family Hominidae (apes, human)

Order Rodentia
Family Aplodontiidae (sewellel or mountain beaver)
Family Sciuridae (squirrels)
Family Gliridae (dormice)
Family Castoridae (beavers)
Family Heteromyidae (kangaroo rats, pocket mice)
Family Geomyidae (pocket gophers)
Family Dipodidae (jerboas, birch mice, jumping mice)
Family Platacanthomyidae (tree mice)
Family Spalacidae (zokors, bamboo rats, mole rats)
Family Calomyscidae (calomyscuses)
Family Nesomyidae (pouched rats and mice, climbing and fat mice, etc.)
Family Cricetidae (voles, hamsters, New World rats and mice
Family Muridae (rats, mice)
Family Anomaluridae (scaily-tailed flying squirrels)
Family Pedetidae (springhaas, springhares)
Family Ctenodactylidae (gundis)
Family Diatomyidae (kha-nyous or Laotian rock rat)

Family Bathyergidae (mole-rats)
Family Hystricidae (African and Asian porcupines)
Family Petromuridae (dassie rat)
Family Thryonomyidae (can rats)
Family Erethizontidae (bristle-spined rat and New World porcupines)
Family Chinchillidae (chinchillas, vizcachas)
Family Dinomyidae (pacarana)
Family Caviidae (cuis, guinea-pigs, cavies, maras, capybaras)

Family Dasyproctidae (agoutis, acouchis)

Family Cuniculidae (pacas)
Family Ctenomyidae (tuco-tucos)
Family Octodontidae (degus, rock rats, vizcacha-rats)
Family Abrocomidae (chinchilla rats)
Family Echimyidae (spiny rats, tree rats, hutias, & coypu)
Family †Heptaxodontidae (giant hutias and key mice)
Order Lagomorpha
Family Ochotonidae (pikas)
Family †Prolagidae (Sardinian pika)
Family Leporidae (rabbits)
Order Eulipotyphla
Family Erinaceidae (hedgehogs, gymnures)
Family †Nesophontidae (nesophontes)
Family Solenodontidae (solenodons, alamiquis)
Family Soricidae (shrews)
Family Talpidae (moles, desmans)
Order Chiroptera
Family Pteropodidae (Old World fruit bats, flying foxes)
Family Rhinopomatidae (mouse-tailed bats)
Family Craseonycteridae (hog-nosed or bumblebee bat)
Family Megadermatidae (false vampire bats)
Family Rhinolophidae (horseshoe bats)
Family Emballonuridae (sac-winged bats)
Family Nycteridae (slit-faced bats)
Family Myzopodidae (sucker-footed bats)
Family Mystacinidae (New Zealand short-tailed bats)
Family Thyropteridae (disk-winged bats)
Family Furipteridae (smokey bat and thumbless bat)
Family Noctilionidae (bulldog bats)
Family Mormoopidae (mustached and ghost-faced bats)
Family Phyllostomidae (New World leaf-nosed bats)
Family Natalidae (funnel-eared bats)
Family Molossidae (free-tailed bats)
Family Vespertilionidae (evening bats, common bats)
Family Miniopteridae (bent-winged or long-fingered bats)
Order Pholidota
Family Manidae (pangolins)
Order Carnivora
Family Felidae (cats)
Family Viverridae (civets, genets)
Family Eupleridae (falanouc, fossa, Madagascaran mongooses)
Family Nandiniidae (African palm civet)
Family Herpestidae (mongooses)
Family Hyaenidae (hyaenas, aardwolf)
Family Canidae (wolves, foxes, jackals)
Family Ursidae (bears, giant panda)
Family Odobenidae (walrus)
Family Otariidae (eared seals, fur seals, sea lions)
Family Phocidae (earless seals)
Family Mustelidae (weasels, badgers, otters)
Family Procyonidae (raccoons, ringtails, coatis)
Family Ailuridae (red panda)
Order Perissodactyla
Family Equidae (horses, asses, zebras)
Family Tapiridae (tapirs)
Family Rhinocerotidae (rhinoceroses)
Order Artiodactyla
Family Suidae (hogs, pigs)
Family Tayassuidae (peccaries)
Family Hippopotamidae (hippopotamuses)
Family Camelidae (camels, vicunas, guanacos, llamas)
Family Tragulidae (chevrotains and mouse deer)
Family Moschidae (musk deer)
Family Cervidae (deer)
Family Antilocapridae (pronghorn)
Family Giraffidae (giraffe and okapi)
Family Bovidae (antelope, bison, cattle, duikers, goats, sheep, etc.)
Order Cetacea
Family Balaenidae (right whales)
Family Balaenopteridae (rorquals)
Family Eschrichtiidae (gray whales
Family Cetotheriidae (pygmy right whale)
Family Delphinidae (ocean dolphins)
Family Monodontidae (narwhal and beluga)
Family Phocoenidae (porpoises)

Family Physeteridae (sperm whales)
Family Platanistidae (Ganges and Indus river dolphins)
Family Iniidae (baiji, franciscana, and Amazon river dolphins)
Family Ziphiidae (beaked whales)

McKenna/Bell classification
In 1997, the classification of mammals was revised by Malcolm C. McKenna and Susan K. Bell. The Classification of Mammals Above the species level, here referred to as the "McKenna/Bell classification", is a comprehensive work on the systematics, relationships, and occurrences of all mammal taxa, living and extinct, down through the rank of genus. The authors worked together as paleontologists at the American Museum of Natural History, New York. McKenna inherited the project from Simpson and, with Bell, constructed a completely updated hierarchical system, covering living and extinct taxa that reflects the historical genealogy of Mammalia.

The McKenna/Bell hierarchical listing of all of the terms used for mammal groups above the species includes extinct mammals as well as modern groups, and introduces some fine distinctions such as legions and sublegions and ranks which fall between classes and orders that are likely to be glossed over by the layman.

Click on the highlighted link for a table comparing the traditional and the new McKenna/Bell classifications of mammals.

Extinct groups are represented by †.

Subclass Prototheria
(monotremes)
Order Platypoda: platypuses
Family Ornithorhynchidae: platypuses
Order Tachyglossa: echidnas (spiny anteaters)
Family Tachyglossidae: echidnas

Subclass Theriiformes
Infraclass †Allotheria
Order †Multituberculata: multituberculates
Family †Plagiaulacidae
Family †Bolodontidae
Family †Hahnodontidae
Family †Albionbaataridae
Family †Arginbaataridae
Family †Kogaionidae
Suborder †Cimolodonta
Family †Sloanbaataridae
 Superfamily †Ptilodontoidea
Family †Cimolodontidae
Family †Ptilodontidae
Superfamily †Taeniolabidoidea
Family †Cimolomyidae
Family †Eucosmodontidae
Family †Taeniolabididae

Suborder †Gondwanatheria
Family †Ferugliotheriidae
Family †Sudamericidae
Infraclass †Triconodonta
Family †Austrotriconodontidae
Family †Amphilestidae
Family †Triconodontidae
Infraclass Holotheria
Family †Chronoperatidae
Superlegion †Kuehneotheria
Family †Kuehneotheriidae
Family †Woutersiidae
Superlegion Trechnotheria
Legion †Symmetrodonta
Family †Shuotheriidae
Order †Amphidontoidea
Family †Amphidontidae
Order †Spalacotherioidea
Family †Tinodontidae
Family †Spalacotheriidae
Family †Barbereniidae
Legion Cladotheria
Sublegion †Dryolestoidea
Order †Dryolestida

Family †Dryolestidae
Family †Paurodontidae
Family †Donodontidae
Family †Mesungulatidae
Family †Reigitheriidae
Family †Brandoniidae
Order †Amphitheriida
Family †Amphitheriidae
Sublegion Zatheria
Family †Arguitheriidae
Family †Arguimuridae
Family †Vincelestidae
Infralegion †Peramura
Family †Peramuridae
Infralegion Tribosphenida
Family †Necrolestidae
Supercohort †Aegialodontia
Family †Aegialodontidae
Supercohort Theria: therian mammals
Family †Pappotheriidae
Family †Holoclemensiidae
Family †Kermackiidae
Family †Endotheriidae
Family †Picopsidae
Family †Potamotelsidae
Family †Plicatodontidae
Order †Deltatheroida
Family †Deltatheridiidae
Family †Deltatheroididae
Order †Asiadelphia
Family †Asiatheriidae
Cohort Marsupialia: marsupials
Family †Yingabalanaridae
Suborder †Archimetatheria 
Family †Stagodontidae
Family †Pediomyidae
Magnorder Australidelphia
Superorder Microbiotheria
Family Microbiotheriidae: monito del monte
Superorder Eometatheria
Order †Yalkaparidontia
Family †Yalkaparidontidae
Order Notoryctemorphia: marsupial moles
Family Notoryctidae: marsupial moles
Grandorder Dasyuromorphia: marsupial carnivores
Family †Thylacinidae: recently extinct Tasmanian tiger and relatives
Family Dasyuridae: Tasmanian devil, quolls, numbat, etc.

Grandorder Syndactyli: syndactylous marsupials
Order Peramelia: bandicoots
Family Peramelidae
Family Peroryctidae
Order Diprotodontia
Family †Palorchestidae
Family †Wynardiidae
Family †Thylacoleonidae
Family Tarsipedidae: honey possum
Superfamily Vombatoidea
Family †Ilariidae
Family †Diprotodontidae
Family Vombatidae: wombats
Superfamily Phalangeroidea
Family Phalangeridae: phalangers
Family Burramyidae: pygmy possums
Family Macropodidae: rat kangaroos, kangaroos and wallabies
Family Petauridae: gliders
Family †Ektopodontidae
Family Phascolarctidae: koala
Family †Pilkipildridae
Family †Miralinidae
Family Acrobatidae: feather-tail glider, pen-tailed phalanger
Magnorder Ameridelphia
Order Didelphimorphia: opossums
Family Didelphidae: opossums
Family †Sparassocynidae
Order Paucituberculata
Superfamily Caenolestoidea 
Family †Sternbergiidae
Family Caenolestidae: rat or shrew opossums
Family †Paleothentidae
Family †Abderitidae
Superfamily †Polydolopoidea 
Family †Sillustaniidae
Family †Polydolopidae
Family †Prepidolopidae
Family †Bonapartheriidae
Superfamily †Argyrolagoidea
Family †Argyrolagidae
Family †Patagoniidae 
Family †Groeberiidae 
Superfamily †Caroloameghinioidea
Family †Glasbiidae
Family †Caroloameghiniidae
Order †Sparassodonta
Family †Mayulestidae
Family †Hondadelphidae
Family †Borhyaenidae
Cohort Placentalia: placentals                  
Order †Bibymalagasia
Magnorder Xenarthra: edentates
Order Cingulata: armadillos and relatives
Family †Protobradidae 
Superfamily Dasypodoidea
Family Dasypodidae: armadillos
Family †Peltephilidae
Superfamily †Glyptodontoidea
Family †Pampatheriidae
Family †Palaeopeltidae
Family †Glyptodontidae: glyptodonts
Order Pilosa: anteaters, sloths, and relatives
Family †Entelopidae
Suborder Vermilingua
Family Myrmecophagidae: giant anteaters and relatives
Family Cyclopedidae: pygmy anteater
Suborder Phyllophaga
Family †Rathymotheriidae
Infraorder †Mylodonta
Superfamily †Mylodontoidea
Family †Scelidotheriidae
Family †Mylodontidae
Superfamily †Orophodontoidea
Family †Orophodontidae
Infraorder Megatheria
Superfamily Megatherioidea
Family †Megatheriidae: ground sloths
Family Megalonychidae: two-toed sloths
Superfamily Bradypodoidea
Family Bradypodidae: three-toed sloths
Magnorder Epitheria: epitheres
Superorder †Leptictida
Family †Gypsonictopidae
Family †Kulbeckiidae
Family †Didymoconidae
Family †Leptictidae
Superorder Preptotheria
Grandorder Anagalida
Family †Zambdalestidae
Family †Anagalidae
Family †Pseudictopidae
Mirorder Macroscelidea: elephant shrews
Family Macroscelididae: elephant shrews
Mirorder Duplicidentata
Order †Mimotonida
Family †Mimotonidae
Order Lagomorpha
Family Ochotonidae: pikas
Family Leporidae: rabbits
Mirorder Simplicidentata
Order †Mixodontia
Family †Eurymylidae
Order Rodentia: rodents
Family †Alagomyidae
Family †Laredomyidae
Suborder Sciuromorpha 
Superfamily †Ischyromyoidea
Family †Ischyromyidae
Superfamily Aplodontoidea
Family †Allomyidae
Family Aplodontiidae: mountain beaver
Family †Mylagaulidae
Infraorder †Theridomyomorpha
Family †Theridomyidae
Infraorder Sciurida
Family †Reithroparamyidae
Family Sciuridae: squirrels
Infraorder Castorimorpha 
Family †Eutypomyidae
Family Castoridae: beavers
Family †Rhizospalacidae
Suborder Myomorpha
Family †Protoptychidae
Infraorder Myodonta
Superfamily Dipodoidea
Family †Armintomyidae
Family Dipodidae: jumping mice, jerboas
Superfamily Muroidea
Family †Simimyidae
Family Muridae: rats, mice, and relatives
Infraorder Glirimorpha
Family Myoxidae: dormice
Infraorder Geomorpha
Superfamily †Eomyoidea
Family †Eomyidae
Superfamily Geomyoidea
Family †Florentiamyidae
Family Geomyidae: pocket gophers, pocket mice, and kangaroo rats
Suborder Anomaluromorpha                                                 
Superfamily Pedetoidea 
Family †Parapedetidae
Family Pedetidae: springhaas
Superfamily Anomaluroidea
Family †Zegdoumyidae
Family Anomaluridae: scaly-tailed squirrels
Suborder Sciuravida
Family †Ivanantoniidae
Family †Sciuravidae
Family †Chapattimyidae
Family †Cylindrodontidae
Family Ctenodactylidae: gundis
Suborder Hystricognatha
Family †Tsaganomyidae
Infraorder Hystricognathi
Family Hystricidae: Old World porcupines
Family Erethizontidae: New World porcupines
Family †Myophiomyidae
Family †Diamantomyidae
Family †Phiomyidae
Family †Kenyamyidae
Family Petromuridae: rock rats
Family Thryonomyidae: cane rats
Parvorder Bathyergomorphi
Family Bathyergidae: mole-rats
Family †Bathyergoididae
Parvorder Caviida 
Superfamily Cavioidea
Family Agoutidae: agoutis and pacas
Family †Eocardiidae
Family Dinomyidae: pacarana
Family Caviidae: cavies
Family Hydrochoeridae: capybara
Superfamily Octodontoidea 
Family Octodontidae: degus, tuco-tucos
Family Echimyidae: spiny rats, nutria
Family Capromyidae: hutias
Family †Heptaxodontidae
Superfamily Chinchilloidea
Family Chinchillidae: chinchillas, viscachas
Family †Neoepiblemidae
Family Abrocomidae: rat chinchillas
Grandorder Ferae                                        
Order Cimolesta - pangolins and relatives
Family †Palaeoryctidae
Suborder †Didelphodonta
Family †Cimolestidae
Suborder †Apatotheria
Family †Apatemyidae
Suborder †Taeniodonta
Family †Stylinodontidae
Suborder †Tillodonta
Family †Tillotheriidae
Suborder †Pantodonta
Family †Wangliidae
Superfamily †Bemalambdoidea 
Family †Harpyodidae
Family †Bemalambdidae
Superfamily †Pantolambdoidea 
Family †Pastoralodontidae
Family †Titanoideidae
Family †Pantolambdidae
Family †Barylambdidae
Family †Cyriacotheriidae
Family †Pantolambdodontidae
Superfamily †Coryphodontoidea
Family †Coryphodontidae
Suborder †Pantolesta
Family †Pantolestidae
Family †Paroxyclaenidae
Family †Ptolemaiidae
Suborder Pholidota
Family †Epoicotheriidae
Family †Metacheiromyidae
Family Manidae: pangolins
Suborder †Ernanodonta
Family †Ernanodontidae
Order †Creodonta: creodonts
Family †Hyaenodontidae
Family †Oxyaenidae
Order Carnivora
Suborder Feliformia
Family †Viverravidae
Family †Nimravidae
Family Felidae: cats
Family Viverridae: civets, Asiatic palm civets
Family Herpestidae: mongooses
Family Hyaenidae: hyaenas, aardwolf
Family Nandiniidae: African palm civets
Suborder Caniformia
Family †Miacidae
Infraorder Cynoidea
Family Canidae: dogs
Infraorder Arctoidea
Parvorder Ursida
Superfamily †Amphicyonoidea
Family †Amphicyonidae
Superfamily Ursoidea 
Family Ursidae: bears
Family †Hemicyonidae
Superfamily Phocoidea
Family Otariidae: eared seals
Family Phocidae: seals, walrus
Parvorder Mustelida
Family Mustelidae: weasels, skunks, and relatives
Family Procyonidae: ringtails, olingos, kinkajou, raccoons, coatis, red panda
Grandorder Lipotyphla
Family †Adapisoriculidae
Order Chrysochloridea
Family Chrysochloridae: golden moles
Order Erinaceomorpha
Family †Sespedectidae
Family †Amphilemuridae
Family †Adapisoricidae
Family †Creotarsidae
Superfamily Erinaceoidea
Family Erinaceidae: hedgehogs and relatives
Superfamily Talpoidea
Family †Proscalopidae
Family Talpidae: moles
Family †Dimylidae
Order Soricomorpha
Family †Otlestidae
Family †Geolabididae
Superfamily Soricoidea
Family †Nesophontidae: recently extinct west Indian shrews
Family †Micropternodontidae
Family †Apternodontidae
Family Solenodontidae: solenodons
Family †Plesiosoricidae
Family †Nyctitheriidae
Family Soricidae: shrews
Superfamily Tenrecoidea
Family Tenrecidae: tenrecs
Grandorder Archonta                                            
Order Chiroptera: bats
Suborder Megachiroptera 
Family Pteropodidae: flying foxes
Suborder Microchiroptera
Family †Archaeonycteridae
Family †Paleochiropterygidae
Family †Hassianycterididae
Family Emballonuridae: sac-winged bats
Infraorder Yinochiroptera 
Superfamily Rhinopomatoidea 
Family Rhinopomatidae: mouse-tailed bats
Family Craseonycteridae: bumblebee bats
Superfamily Rhinolophoidea
Family Megadermatidae: false vampire bats
Family Nycteridae: hispid bats
Family Rhinolophidae: horseshoe and Old World leaf-nosed bats
Infraorder Yangochiroptera
Family Mystacinidae: New Zealand short-tailed bats
Superfamily Noctilionoidea 
Family Noctilionidae: fishing bats
Family Mormoopidae: spectacled bats
Family Phyllostomidae: New World leaf-nosed and vampire bats
Superfamily Vespertilionoidea 
Family †Philisidae
Family Molossidae: free-tailed bats
Family Natalidae: funnel-eared bats
Family Furipteridae: smoky bats
Family Thyropteridae: New World sucker-footed bats
Family Myzopodidae: Old World sucker-footed bats
Family Vespertilionidae: common bats
Order Primates: primates
Family †Purgatoriidae
Family †Microsyopidae
Family †Micromomyidae
Family †Picromomyidae
Family †Plesiadapidae
Family †Palaechthonidae
Family †Picrodontidae
Suborder Dermoptera 
Family †Paramomyidae
Family †Plagiomenidae
Family †Mixodectidae
Family Galeopithecidae: colugos
Suborder Euprimates 
Infraorder Strepsirrhini 
Family †Plesiopithecidae
Superfamily Daubentonioidea
Family Daubentoniidae: aye-aye
Superfamily Lemuroidea 
Family †Adapidae
Family Lemuridae: lemurs
Superfamily Loroidea 
Family Lorisidae: lorises and galagos
Family Cheirogaleidae: dwarf lemurs
Superfamily Indroidea
Family †Archaeolemuridae
Family †Palaeopropithecidae
Family Indriidae: indris and sifakas
Infraorder Haplorhini 
Parvorder Tarsiiformes 
Superfamily †Carpolestoidea 
Family †Carpolestidae
Superfamily Tarsioidea
Family †Omomyidae
Family †Microchoeridae
Family †Afrotarsiidae
Family Tarsiidae: tarsiers
Parvorder Anthropoidea
Family †Eosimiidae
Family †Parapithecidae
Superfamily Cercopithecoidea
Family †Pliopithecidae
Family Cercopithecidae: Old World monkeys including colobuses
Family Hominidae: humans, greater apes, lesser apes
Superfamily Callitrichoidea
Family Callitrichidae: marmosets
Family Atelidae: New World monkeys
Order Scandentia
Family Tupaiidae: tree shrews
Grandorder Ungulata: ungulates                    
Order Tubulidentata
Family Orycteropodidae: aardvark
Order †Dinocerata
Family †Uintatheriidae
Mirorder Eparctocyona
Order †Procreodi
Family †Oxyclaenidae
Family †Arctocyonidae
Order †Condylarthra
Family †Hyopsodontidae
Family †Mioclaenidae
Family †Phenacodontidae
Family †Periptychidae
Family †Peligrotheriidae
Family †Didolodontidae
Order †Arctostylopida
Family †Arctostylopidae
Order Cete: whales and relatives
Suborder †Acreodi 
Family †Triisodontidae
Family †Mesonychidae: mesonychids
Family †Hapalodectidae
Suborder Cetacea
Infraorder †Archaeoceti 
Family †Basilosauridae
Family †Protocetidae
Family †Remingtonocetidae
Infraorder Autoceta
Family †Agorophiidae
Superfamily †Squalodontoidea 
Family †Squalodontidae
Family †Rhabdosteidae
Parvorder Mysticeti 
Family †Aetiocetidae
Family †Mammalodontidae
Family †Cetotheriidae
Family Balaenopteridae: rorquals and grey whales
Family Balaenidae: right and bowhead whales
Parvorder Odontoceti
Superfamily Physeteroidea 
Family Physeteridae: sperm whales
Superfamily Hyperoodontoidea 
Family Hyperoodontidae: beaked whales
Superfamily Platanistoidea
Family Platanistidae: river dolphins
Superfamily Delphinoidea
Family Delphinidae: dolphins
Family Pontoporiidae: La Plata River dolphin
Family Lipotidae: baiiji
Family Iniidae: Amazon River dolphin
Family †Kentridontidae
Family Monodontidae: beluga and narwhal
Family †Odobenocetopsidae
Family †Dalpiazinidae
Family †Acrodelphinidae
Family Phocoenidae: porpoises
Family †Albireonidae
Family †Hemisyntrachelidae
Order Artiodactyla: even-toed ungulates
Suborder Suiformes 
Family †Raoellidae
Family †Choeropotamidae
Superfamily Suoidea
Family Suidae: pigs
Family Tayassuidae: peccaries
Family †Santheriidae
Family Hippopotamidae: hippos
Superfamily †Dichobunoidea 
Family †Dichobunidae
Family †Cebochoeridae
Family †Mixtotheriidae
Family †Helohyidae
Superfamily †Anthracotherioidea 
Family †Haplobunodontidae
Family †Anthracotheriidae
Superfamily †Anoplotherioidea
Family †Dacrytheriidae
Family †Anoplotheriidae
Family †Cainotheriidae
Superfamily †Oreodontoidea 
Family †Agriochoeridae
Family †Oreodontidae
Superfamily †Entelodontoidea 
Family †Entelodontidae
Suborder Tylopoda
Family †Xiphodontidae
Superfamily Cameloidea
Family Camelidae: camels and llamas
Family †Oromerycidae
Superfamily †Protoceratoidea 
Family †Protoceratidae
Suborder Ruminantia 
Family †Amphimerycidae
Family †Hypertragulidae
Family Tragulidae: mouse deer
Family †Leptomerycidae
Family †Bachitheriidae
Family †Lophiomerycidae
Family †Gelocidae
Superfamily Cervoidea
Family Moschidae: musk deer
Family Antilocapridae: pronghorn
Family †Palaeomerycidae
Family †Hoplitomerycidae
Family Cervidae: deer
Superfamily Giraffoidea 
Family †Climacoceratidae
Family Giraffidae: giraffe and okapi
Superfamily Bovoidea
Family Bovidae: cattle, antelope, and relatives
Mirorder †Meridiungulata
Family †Perutheriidae
Family †Amilnedwardsiidae
Order †Litopterna
Family †Protolipternidae
Superfamily †Macrauchenioidea 
Family †Macraucheniidae
Family †Notonychopidae
Family †Adianthidae
Superfamily †Proterotherioidea
Family †Proterotheriidae
Order †Notoungulata: notoungulates
Suborder †Notioprogonia 
Family †Henricosborniidae
Family †Notostylopidae
Suborder †Toxodontia
Family †Isotemnidae
Family †Leontiniidae
Family †Notohippidae
Family †Toxodontidae
Family †Homalodotheriidae
Suborder †Typotheria
Family †Archaeopithecidae
Family †Oldfieldthomasiidae
Family †Interatheriidae
Family †Campanorcidae
Family †Mesotheriidae
Suborder †Hegetotheria
Family †Archaeohyracidae
Family †Hegetotheriidae
Order †Astrapotheria
Family †Eoastrapostylopidae
Family †Trigonostylopidae
Family †Astrapotheriidae
Order †Xenungulata
Family †Carodniidae
Order †Pyrotheria
Family †Pyrotheriidae
Mirorder Altungulata
Order Perissodactyla: odd-toed ungulates
Suborder Hippomorpha
Family Equidae: horses
Family †Palaeotheriidae
Suborder Ceratomorpha
Infraorder †Selenida
Superfamily †Brontotherioidea
Family †Brontotheriidae
Family †Anchilophidae
Superfamily †Chalicotherioidea
Family †Eomoropidae
Family †Chalicotheriidae
Infraorder Tapiromorpha
Superfamily Rhinocerotoidea
Family †Hyracodontidae
Family Rhinocerotidae: rhinoceroses
Superfamily Tapiroidea
Family †Helaletidae
Family †Isectolophidae
Family †Lophiodontidae
Family †Deperetellidae
Family †Lophialetidae
Family Tapiridae: tapirs
Order Uranotheria: elephants, manatees, hyraxes, and relatives
Suborder Hyracoidea
Family †Pliohyracidae
Family Procaviidae: hyraxes
Suborder †Embrithopoda 
Family †Phenacolophidae
Family †Arsinoitheriidae
Suborder Tethytheria
Infraorder Sirenia: manatees, dugong, and sea cow 
Family †Prorastomidae
Family Dugongidae: dugongs
Family Trichechidae: manatees
Infraorder Behemota
Parvorder †Desmostylia
Family †Desmostylidae
Parvorder Proboscidea
Family †Anthracobunidae
Family †Moeritheriidae
Family †Numidotheriidae
Family †Barytheriidae
Family †Deinotheriidae
Family †Palaeomastodontidae
Family †Phiomiidae
Family †Hemimastodontidae
Superfamily ‡Mammutoidea
Family †Mammutidae: mastodons and relatives
Superfamily Elephantoidea
Family †Gomphotheriidae: gomphotheres
Family Elephantidae: modern elephants

Luo, Kielan-Jaworowska, and Cifelli classification
Several important fossil mammal discoveries have been made that have led researchers to question many of the relationships proposed by McKenna and Bell (1997). Additionally, researchers are subjecting taxonomic hypotheses to more rigorous cladistic analyses of early mammal fossils. Luo et al. (2002) summarized existing ideas and proposed new ideas of relationships among mammals at the most basal level. They argued that the term mammal should be defined based on characters (especially the dentary-squamosal jaw articulation) instead of a crown-based definition (the group that contains most recent common ancestor of monotremes and therians and all of its descendants). Their definition of Mammalia is roughly equal to the Mammaliaformes as defined by McKenna and Bell (1997) and other authors. They also define their taxonomic levels as clades and do not apply Linnean hierarchies.

Mammalia
†Sinoconodon - earliest and most basal of mammals
Unnamed clade 1 - a clade that contains all other mammals. These are characterized by determinant growth and occlusal features of the cheek teeth.
†Morganucodontidae - morganucodontids, including †Morganucodon, †Megazostrodon, and others
†Docodonta - docodonts, including †Haldanodon and †Castorocauda (Ji et al., 2006)
Unnamed clade 2 - a clade containing all living mammals and some fossil relatives. It is characterized by the loss of a postdentary trough and a widened braincase.
†Hadrocodium
†Kuehneotherium
Crown-group Mammalia - the group that contains most recent common ancestor of monotremes and therians and all of its descendants. This group is defined by additional characters relating the occlusion of molars and the presence of a well-developed masseteric fossa.
Australosphenida - a clade that contains monotremes and their fossil relatives. These fossils include †Ambondro, †Asfaltomylos, †Ausktribosphenos, and †Bishops. If correct, this clade represents an independent evolution of the tribosphenic molar in southern continents.
Trechnotheria - Therians, spalacotheriids and their relatives. They are characterized by features of the scapula, tibia, and humerus.
†Spalacotheriidae - including Akidolestes, Zhangheotherium, and Maotherium.
Cladotheria - Therians, dryolestids, and their relatives. They are characterized by features of the tribosphenic molar and the angular process of the dentary.
†Dryolestidae
†Amphitherium - incertae sedis (it may be a prototribosphenidan)
Prototribosphenida - Therians and fossil relatives including †Vincelestes. Characterized by features of the cochlea including coiling.
†Vincelestes
Zatheria - Therians and fossil relatives including the "peramurids". Characterized by the presence of wear in the talonid of the lower molars.
†"Peramuridae" - †Peramus and relatives. Known only from preserved mandibles and distinctly zatherian molars.
Boreosphenida - Therians and fossil relatives including †Kielantherium. They are characterized by molar features.
†Kielantherium
†Deltatheroida including †Deltatheridium - incertae sedis (it may represent a metatherian)
Crown-group Theria - the group that contains most recent common ancestor of marsupials and placentals and all of its descendants. Characterized by a host of molar features, aspects of the alispenoid, and aspects of the astragalus region.
†Eutriconodonta - incertae sedis. Triconodonts appear to be a member of the crown-Mammalia clade, but their relationships within it are unknown. It is also not certain that they represent a monophyletic group. Examples include Repenomamus.
†Multituberculata - incertae sedis. Luo e al. (2002) argue that multituberculates cannot be confidently placed in a particular clade of mammals. They suggest that they represent either basal mammals or are sister to the Trechnotheria.

Simplified classification for non-specialists

The following classification is a simplified version based on current understanding suitable for non-specialists who want to understand how living genera are related to each other. The classification ignores differences in levels and thus cannot be used to estimate the respective distances between taxa. It also ignores taxa that became extinct in pre-historic times. Finally, English names are preferred whenever they exist. This makes it especially suited for non-specialists who wish to gain an easy overview. For the full picture, the non-simplified versions above should be consulted.

Monotremes (prototheria): echidnas and platypus				
Platypus			
Echidnas (tachyglossids)			
Live-bearing mammals (theria)				
Marsupials	
Opossums (didelphids)									
Shrew opossums (caenolestids)	
Australodelphia: Australian marsupials and monito del Monte										
Monito del Monte									
Dasyuromorphs									
Dasyurids: antechinuses, quolls, dunnarts, Tasmanian devil, and allies								
Numbat								
Peramelemorphs: bilbies and bandicoots									
Bilbies (thylacomyids)								
Bandicoots (peramelids)								
Marsupial moles (notoryctids)									
Diprotodonts									
Koala								
Wombats (vombatids)								
Phalangerids: brushtail possums and cuscuses								
Pygmy possums (burramyids)								
Honey possum								
Petaurids: striped and Leadbeater's possums, and yellow-bellied, suger, mahogany and squirrel glider
Ringtailed possums (pseudocheirids)								
Potorids: potoroos, rat kangaroos and bettongs								
Acrobatids: feathertail glider and feather-tailed possum								
Musky rat-kangaroo								
Macropodids: kangaroos, wallabies and allies																
Placentals											
Atlantic placentals (atlantogenatans)										
Afroplacentals (afrotherians)									
Afroinsectiphilians: elephant shrews, tenrecs, otter shrews, golden moles, and aardvark
Elephant shrews (macroscelidids)							
Afrosoricids: tenrecs and golden moles							
Tenrecids: tenrecs and otter shrews						
Golden moles (chrysochlorids)						
Aardvark							
Paenungulates: hyraxes, elephants, dugongs and manatees								
Hyraxes or dassies (procaviids)							
Elephants (elephantids)							
Sirenians: dugong and manatees							
Dugong						
Manatees (trichechids)						
Xenarthrans									
Pilosans: sloths and anteaters								
Anteaters (vermilinguans)							
Silky anteater						
Myrmecophagids: giant anteater and tamanduas						
Sloths (folivorans)							
Three-toed sloths (bradypodids)						
Two-toed sloths (megalonychids)						
Armadillos (dasypodids)								
Northern placentals (boreoeutherians)										
Supraprimates (euarchontoglires)									
Euarchontans: treeshrews, colugos and primates								
Treeshrews (scandentians)							
Tupaiids: all treeshrews except pen-tailed						
Pen-tailed treeshrew						
Colugos or flying lemurs (cynocephalids)							
Primates							
Strepsirrhines: lemur- and loris-like primates						
Lemur-like primates (lemuriforms)					
Cheirogaleids: dwarf lemurs and mouse-lemurs				
Aye-aye				
True lemurs (lemurids)				
Sportive lemurs (lepilemurids)				
Indriids: woolly lemurs and allies				
Loris-like primates (lorisiforms)					
Lorisids: lorises, pottos and allies				
Galagos (galagids)				
Haplorhines: tarsiers, monkeys and apes						
Tarsiers (tarsiids)					
Anthropoid primates					
New World monkeys (platyrrhines)				
Callitrichids: marmosets and tamarins			
Cebids: capuchins and squirrel monkeys			
Aotids: night or owl monkeys			
Pitheciids: titis, sakis and uakaris			
Atelids: howler, spider, woolly spider, and woolly monkeys			
Catarrhines				
Old World monkeys (cercopithecids)			
Hominoid primates			
Gibbons (hylobatids)		
Great apes (hominids): incl. Humans		
Glires: pikas, rabbits, hares, and rodents								
Lagomorphs: pikas, rabbits and hares							
Leporids: rabbits and hares						
Pikas (ochotonids)						
Rodents							
Anomalure-like rodents (anomaluromorphs): Scaly-tailed squirrels and springhares						
Scaly-tailed squirrels or anomalures (anomalurids)					
Springhares (pedetids)					
Beaver-like rodents (castorimorphs)						
Beavers (castorids)					
Gopher-like rodents (geomyoid rodents)					
Pocket or true gophers (geomyids)				
Heteromyids: kangaroo rats and kangaroo mice				
Porcupine-like rodents (hystricomorphs)						
Laotian rock rat					
Gundis (ctenodactylids)					
Hystricognaths					
African mole rats (bathyergids)				
Old World porcupines (hystricids)				
Dassie rat				
Cane rats (thryonomyids)				
Cavy-like rodents (caviomorphs)				
Chinchilla rats (abrocomids)			
Hutias (capromyids)			
Cavies (caviids): incl. Guinea pigs and capybara			
Chinchillids: chinchillas and viscachas			
Tuco-tucos (ctenomyids)			
Agoutis (dasyproctids)			
Pacas (cuniculids)			
Pacarana			
Spiny rats (echymyids)			
New World porcupines (erethizontids)			
Myocastorids: nutria and coypu			
Octodonts (octodontids): Andean rock-rats, degus and viscacha-rats			
Mouse-like rodents (myomorphs)						
Dipodids: jerboas and jumping mice					
Muroid rodents					
Mouse-like hamsters (calomyscids)				
Cricetids: hamsters, New World rats and mice, voles				
Murids: true mice and rats, gerbils, spiny mice, crested rat				
Nesomyids: climbing mice, rock mice, white-tailed rat, Malagasy rats and mice				
Spiny dormice (platacanthomyids)				
Spalacids: mole rats, bamboo rats, and zokors				
Squirrel-like rodents (sciuromorphs)						
Mountain beaver					
Dormice (glirids)					
Squirrels (sciurids): incl. chipmunks, prairie dogs, and marmots					
Laurasian placentals (laurasiatherians)									
Hedgehogs (erinaceids)								
Soricomorphs: moles, shrews, solenodons								
Shrews (soricids)							
Moles (talpids)							
Solenodons (solenodontids)							
Ferungulates: ungulates, cetaceans, bats, pangolins and carnivorans								
Cetartiodactyls: even-toed ungulates and cetaceans							
Camelids: camels and llamas						
Swine (suinans): pigs and peccaries						
Pigs (suids)					
Peccaries (tayassuids)					
Cetruminantians: cetaceans, hippos and ruminants						
Cetancodonts: cetaceans and hippos					
Cetaceans: Whales, dolphins and porpoises				
Baleen whales (mysticetes)			
Balaenids: right whales and bowhead whale		
Rorquals (balaenopterids)		
Gray whale		
Pygmy right whale		
Toothed whales (odontocetes)			
Dolphins (delphinids)		
Monodontids: beluga and narwhal		
Beluga	
Narwhal	
Porpoises (phocoenids)		
Sperm whale		
Kogiids: pygmy and dwarf sperm whale		
River dolphins (platanistoid whales)		
Iniids: Amazon and Bolivian river dolphin	
La Plata dolphin	
Platanistids: Ganges and Indus river dolphins	
Beaked whales (ziphids)		
Hippos (hippopotamids)				
Ruminantiamorphs: chevrotains, pronghorn, giraffes, musk deer, deer, and bovids					
Chevrotains (tragulids)				
Pecorans				
Pronghorn			
Giraffids: giraffe and okapi			
Musk deer (moschids)			
Deer (cervids)			
Bovids: cattle, goats, sheep and antelope			
Pegasoferans: bats, odd-toed ungulates, pangolins and carnivorans							
Bats (chiropterans)						
Megabats (pteropodids)					
Microbats (microchiropterans)					
Sac-winged or sheath-tailed bats (emballonurids)				
Rhinopomatoid bats				
Mouse-tailed bats (rhinopomatids)			
Bumblebee bat or Kitti's hog-nosed bat			
Rhinolophoid bats				
Horseshoe bats (rhinolophids)			
Hollow-faced or slit-faced bats (nycterids)			
False vampires (megadermatids)			
Vesper bats or evening bats (vespertilionids)				
Molossoid bats				
Free-tailed bats (molossids)			
Pallid bats (antrozoids)			
Nataloid bats				
Funnel-eared bats (natalids)			
Sucker-footed bats (myzopodids)			
Disc-winged bats (thyropterids)			
Smoky bats (furipterids)			
Noctilionoid bats				
Bulldog or fisherman bats (noctilionids)			
New Zealand short-tailed bats (mystacinids)			
Ghost-faced or moustached bats (mormoopids)			
Leaf-nosed bats (phyllostomids)			
Zooamatans: odd-toed ungulates, pangolins and carnivorans						
Odd-toed ungulates (perissodactyls)					
Horses (equids)				
Ceratomorphs				
Tapirs (tapirids)			
Rhinoceroses (rhinocerotids)			
Ferans					
Pangolins or scaly anteaters (manids)				
Carnivorans				
Cat-like carnivorans (feliforms)			
African palm civet		
Feloid carnivorans		
Asiatic linsangs (prionodontids)	
Cats (felids)
Viverroid carnivorans		
Viverrids: civets and allies	
Herpestoid carnivorans	
Hyaenids: hyenas and aardwolf
Malagasy carnivorans (euplerids)
Herpestids: mongooses and allies
Dog-like carnivorans (caniforms)			
Canids: dogs and allies		
Arctoid carnivorans		
Bears (ursids)	
Musteloid carnivorans	
Red panda
Mephitids: skunks and stink badgers
Mustelids: weasels, martens, badgers, wolverines, minks, ferrets and otters
Procyonids: raccoons and allies
Pinnipeds	
Walrus
Otariids: sea lions, eared seals, fur seals
True seals (phocids)

See also
Animal
List of mammals
List of prehistoric mammals
Mammal

References 

 
 Wilson, Don E. and Deeann M. Reeder (eds). (1993.) Mammal Species of the World. Smithsonian Institution Press, 1206 pp. 
 McKenna, Malcolm C. and Bell, Susan K. (1997.) Classification of Mammals Above the Species Level. Columbia University Press, New York, 631 pp. 
 Nowak, Ronald M. (1999.) Walker's Mammals of the World, 6th edition. Johns Hopkins University Press, 1936 pp. 
 Vaughan, Terry A., James M. Ryan and Nicholas J. Capzaplewski. (2000.) Mammalogy: Fourth Edition. Saunders College Publishing, 565 pp.  (Brooks Cole, 1999)
 
 
 

Mammal classification
Systems of animal taxonomy